Chimaira is the third studio album by Chimaira, released on August 9, 2005. It debuted No. 74 on the Billboard 200 charts and sold 14,000 copies in the United States in its first week of release (according to Nielsen SoundScan). The album would be the band's final release under Roadrunner Records and the only one to feature Kevin Talley on drums.

Production
Chimaira would mark further progression in heaviness. Band member Chris Spicuzza described the album as "the next natural step from Impossibility of Reason . . . definitely more brutal." He noted its deemphasise on melodic tracks, alluding to the 2003 song "Down Again", and described the writing process as having "zero limitations".

All lyrics were written by vocalist Mark Hunter. The opening track "Nothing Remains" was written on the day that Dimebag Darrell was shot, but was not written specifically about his death.

Track listing

The album was re-issued in 2006 with a bonus disc containing nine additional tracks. All live tracks are from The Dehumanizing Process DVD. The tracks "Clayden" and "Malignant" are covers of Ascension songs. Ascension was a band that former Chimaira members Jason Hagar and Matt DeVries were in before they joined Chimaira.

Personnel
Chimaira
Rob Arnold – lead guitar
Matt DeVries – rhythm guitar
Mark Hunter – vocals
Jim LaMarca – bass guitar
Chris Spicuzza – synthesizers, sampling
Kevin Talley – drums
Additional musicians
Andols Herrick – live drums (2006 Bonus Disc, Tracks 3–9), tracked drums (2009 Digital Special Edition, Track 11)
Production
Produced by Ben Schigel and Mark Hunter at Spider Studios
Mixed by Ben Schigel and Colin Richardson
Engineered by Ben Schigel, Tony Gammalo and Tom Kubik
Mastered by Ted Jensen at Sterling Sound
Artwork, design, photography and art direction by Garrett Zunt
Additional photography by Todd Bell

References

External links
omnes.tv :: Unsigned - Episode 69 : Deveries talk about why he left band and his future plans
                          

Chimaira albums
2005 albums
Roadrunner Records albums